Denis Sergeyevich Spirin (born 2 January 1980 in Mineralnye Vody) is a former Russian football player.

References

1980 births
People from Mineralnye Vody
Living people
Russian footballers
FC Elista players
Russian Premier League players
FC Baltika Kaliningrad players
FC Volgar Astrakhan players
FC Dynamo Bryansk players
Association football defenders
Sportspeople from Stavropol Krai